The year 1784 in science and technology involved some significant events.

Astronomy
 September 10 – Edward Pigott identifies the variable star Eta Aquilae from York, England.
 October 19 – John Goodricke begins his observations of the variable star Delta Cephei from York.

Biology
 Publication of the Annals of Agriculture edited by Arthur Young begins in Great Britain.
 Peter Simon Pallas begins publication of Flora Rossica, the first Flora of Russia.

Chemistry
 L'Abbé René Just Haüy states the geometrical law of crystallization.
 Antoine Lavoisier pioneers stoichiometry.
 Citric acid is first isolated by Carl Wilhelm Scheele, who crystallizes it from lemon juice.
 Cholesterol is isolated.

History of science
 Publication of David Bourgeois' Recherches sur l'art de voler, depuis la plus haute antiquité jusque'a ce jour in Paris, the earliest work on the history of flight.

Mathematics
 Carl Friedrich Gauss, at the age of seven, pioneers the field of summation with the formula summing 1:n as (n(n+1))/2.

Medicine
 11 February – Royal College of Surgeons in Ireland chartered.
 12 March — Appointment of the French Royal Commission on Animal Magnetism (the Commission's Report was presented to King Louis XVI on 11 August 1784).
 Madame du Coudray, pioneer of modern midwifery in France, retires.
 Benjamin Franklin makes the first known specific reference (in a letter) to the wearing of bifocal spectacles.
 John Hunter first describes the condition phlebitis.

Paleontology
 The first description of a Pterodactylus fossil is made by Cosimo Alessandro Collini, although he is unable to determine what kind of creature it is.

Physics
 January 15 – Henry Cavendish's paper to the Royal Society of London, Experiments on Air, reveals the composition of water.
 Jean-Paul Marat publishes Notions élémentaires d'optique (Elementary Notions of Optics'')

Surveying
 William Roy measures the baseline for the Anglo-French Survey (1784–1790) linking the observatories of Paris and Greenwich. The measurement is accurate to within a few inches in a distance of over 280,000 ft., an unprecedented accuracy for this time. Roy is awarded the Copley Medal in the following year.

Technology
 April 28 – James Watt receives a British patent for his parallel motion and other improvements to the steam engine.
 June 4 – Élisabeth Thible becomes the first woman passenger in a hot-air balloon, at Lyon, France.
 August 21 – Joseph Bramah receives his first lock patent in London.
 Rev. Dr. Edmund Cartwright designs his first power loom in England.
 Henry Cort of Funtley, England, applies the coal-fired reverbatory furnace to the puddling process for conversion of cast to wrought iron.

Awards
 Copley Medal: Edward Waring

Births
 March 12 – William Buckland, English geologist and paleontologist (died 1856)
 June 17 – Andrew Crosse, English 'gentleman scientist', pioneer experimenter in electricity (died 1855)
 July 22 – Friedrich Bessel, German mathematician (died 1846)
 September 1 – Thomas Frederick Colby, English cartographer (died 1852)

Deaths
 May 12 – Abraham Trembley, Genevan naturalist (born 1710)
 September 1 – Jean-François Séguier, French astronomer and botanist (born 1703)
 September 4 – César-François Cassini de Thury, French astronomer (born 1714)

References

 
18th century in science
1780s in science